Marcela Moldovan-Zsak (born 3 June 1956) is a Romanian fencer. She won a silver medal in the women's team foil event at the 1984 Summer Olympics.

References

External links
 

1956 births
Living people
Romanian female foil fencers
Olympic fencers of Romania
Fencers at the 1976 Summer Olympics
Fencers at the 1980 Summer Olympics
Fencers at the 1984 Summer Olympics
Olympic silver medalists for Romania
Olympic medalists in fencing
Sportspeople from Satu Mare
Medalists at the 1984 Summer Olympics